The St. Louis Ambush is a professional indoor soccer team based in St. Charles, Missouri. They are the second team to use this name.  This version of the Ambush play in the Major Arena Soccer League while the original St. Louis Ambush played in the National Professional Soccer League.

The current ownership group of the Ambush is Shelly and Will Clark, and Jeff and Heather Locker

History
 
The Ambush originally joined the Major Indoor Soccer League in 2013. In their only season as members of the MISL, the Ambush posted only four wins while losing sixteen games.

After the 2013–2014 season, the team announced that it was leaving the MISL along with five other teams to join the Major Arena Soccer League.

At a May 3, 2016 press conference in Lakeland, Florida it was announced the Ambush were moving to the newly established IPL with the Baltimore Blast and expansion franchise Florida Tropics SC.  However, on August 29, 2016, it was announced that all IPL teams would be joining (or re-joining) the MASL.

The MASL had a 'free agent' period for the first two weeks of May 2017, where any players who were free agents were free to negotiate with any team in the league. The Saint Louis Ambush failed to sign any players during the 'free agent' period, though few players changed teams in the league during this period in May.

On December 14, 2015, Tony Glavin took over as the head coach of the Saint Louis Ambush and served as the head coach for the remainder of the 2015–2016 season. Glavin continued as head coach in the 2016–2017 season and would finish with a 1–19 record. During the off-season a committee was formed to search for a new coach, with the position expected to be filled by the end of August 2017 prior to team tryouts. On August 28, 2017, the St. Louis Ambush named Hewerton Moreira as their player/head coach.

In the 2017–18 season, the first under Hewerton's leadership, the on field woes continued for the Ambush as they finished the season with a record of 3–19. At one point, the team went an entire year without a single win. Nonetheless, Hewerton's contract was extended on April 16, 2018, through the 2019–2020 season where the team ended with a 10–14 record. Hewerton officially retired as a player after the season and now serves as the full time head coach for the team.

In December 2019, Tony Glavin and Dr. Elizabeth Perez sold their interest in the Ambush to St Charles natives, Jeff and Heather Locker and they join Shelly and Will Clark in the ownership of the Ambush.

In the first week of the 2018 off-season the franchise announced that it was bringing back the Ambush Brigade dance team  as an "effort to improve game-day entertainment." The Brigade has seen a recent name change and are now known as the Bombshells.

The Ambush finished with a record of 8–7 in the abbreviated 2021 season. This is the first winning record for the Ambush since the team started in 2013. The Ambush finished 4th in the standings, of the 7 teams which played in the 2021 season. Several of the league teams were unable to play due to COVID-19 restrictions in their home cities. The Ambush also made their first playoff appearance since returning to indoor soccer in 2013. The Ambush lost both games of a 2-game series to the Kansas City Comets in March 2021.

Year-by-year

Players

Active players
As of January 22, 2021.

Inactive players

Head coaches

  Daryl Doran (2013–2015)
  Tony Glavin (2015–2017)
  Hewerton Moriera (2017–2021)
  Greg Muhr (2021)
  Jeff Locker (2021–present)

Following a 2–4 start to the 21–22 season, Greg Muhr resigned as head coach of the Ambush. The role was filled by co-owner and general manager, Jeff Locker.

Arenas

During the 2013–14 season, the Ambush used both the lower bowl and upper deck of the Family Arena. Since 2014, the Ambush have only used the lower bowl for seating fans. The lower bowl of the Family Arena has a capacity of about 5,000 fans. During the 2021 season, the Family Arena hosted home games for the Ambush and some playoff games, with socially distanced seating. The upper deck of the Arena was also opened up for seating for the first time for indoor soccer games since 2014. Extra precautions were taken, such as having all fans travel in one direction on the concourse, to ensure safe distancing, and air flow in the arena was enhanced.

References

http://www.stlambush.com/stats#/player/133881/bio Nick Kolarac

External links
Official website

 
2013 establishments in Missouri
Major Arena Soccer League teams
Major Indoor Soccer League (2008–2014) teams
Ambush 2013-
Soccer clubs in Missouri
Association football clubs established in 2013
Sports in St. Charles, Missouri